Alampla is a genus of moths in the family Immidae.

Species
Alampla arcifraga (Meyrick, 1914)
Alampla palaeodes (Meyrick, 1914)

References

Immidae
Moth genera